Weigel Broadcasting Co. is an American television broadcasting company based in Chicago, Illinois, alongside its flagship station WCIU-TV (Channel 26), at 26 North Halsted Street in the Greektown neighborhood. It currently owns 25 television stations, seven digital over-the-air television networks (most notably MeTV), and one radio station.

History 
The company was founded by Chicago broadcasting veteran John Weigel, whose career dated back to the 1930s. With $1,000 of his own money and another $1,000 from his attorney, Daniel J. McCarthy, Weigel bought the broadcasting license for what became the first UHF television station in the Chicago area. WCIU signed on the air on February 6, 1964. One year later, in 1965, the company was the subject of a successful hostile takeover at the hands of the Shapiro family.

Over the years, the company began to acquire and also launch new stations in the adjacent markets of Milwaukee and South Bend, at first by placing WCIU translators in those markets to gain a foothold in each market, before programming the stations independently. Weigel would end up an unexpected beneficiary of the television industry realignment of 1994-95. Full-power independent station WDJT-TV in Milwaukee, which had only signed on five years earlier, ended up with the CBS affiliation in late 1994. WBND-LP became the home of ABC programming in South Bend the next year. In both cases, the longtime affiliates of the networks in those markets — WITI in Milwaukee and WSJV in South Bend — switched to Fox, and the Weigel-owned stations secured 11th-hour affiliation deals after no other viable replacement affiliates surfaced.

Also in that same year, WCIU dropped the Spanish-language Univision network and became Chicago's only true full-power independent station when WGN-TV and WPWR-TV joined The WB and UPN networks respectively, while WGBO-TV became a Univision-owned station. These changes allowed WCIU to pursue sports rights and syndicated programming not previously available, ultimately giving WCIU some strength in the market.

Weigel's MeTV format originated as a programming block that debuted on January 6, 2003 on television station WFBT-CA (channel 23) in Chicago, Illinois, an independent station that otherwise featured an ethnic programming format.

In April 2008, Weigel completed the purchase of WJJA-TV in Racine, Wisconsin, which gave the company its second full-power station in the Milwaukee market. The station carried a local version of MeTV for four years before it and the independent format of low-power WMLW-CA were switched around in August 2012, becoming WMLW-TV.

Network expansion
In July 2008, Weigel announced the creation of This TV, a national subchannel network, operated as a joint venture with  Metro-Goldwyn-Mayer.

In early August 2008, Weigel agreed to sell all three of its South Bend stations, WBND-LP, WCWW-LP and WMYS-LP, to Schurz Communications, the longtime owner of the local CBS affiliate WSBT-TV, for undisclosed terms.  However, in the absence of action by the Federal Communications Commission, the deal was called off in August 2009.

Weigel launched You and Me This Morning, an Interstitial program lifestyle news program in fourth quarter (fall) 2009 on WCIU-TV's first two subchannels.

At the end of 2009, Broadcasting & Cable gave Weigel its first annual Multi-Platform Broadcaster of the Year award. The company makes efficient use of digital TV's multicast capabilities, with one main channel and four subchannels for WCIU in Chicago, and MeTV and This TV on subchannels nationwide.

On November 22, 2010, Weigel announced that they would take the MeTV concept national and compete fully with RTV and Antenna TV, while complementing its successful sister network This TV.

On December 1, 2010, WCIU dropped their FBT foreign broadcasting digital subchannel (with some of that programming eventually to be moved to Polnet Communications' WPVN-CA) and is currently airing a simulcast of WCIU-TV on WCIU digital subchannel 26.2. The new digital subchannel, The U Too, was officially launched on January 5, 2011. The new digital network will be airing on WCIU digital subchannel 26.2, replacing MeTV, which moved to WCIU digital subchannel 26.3 on December 15, 2010, and mainly consists of other purchased programming without room on the main WCIU schedule, second runs of WCIU programming or programming burned off due to low ratings.

On January 4, 2011, Metro-Goldwyn-Mayer and Weigel announced plans to distribute MeTV nationwide.

On January 28, 2013, Weigel entered into a partnership with Fox Television Stations to create a new digital subchannel network called Movies!, which is expected to debut on all of Fox's owned-and-operated stations in the spring of 2013. On May 13, 2013, Weigel announced that Tribune Broadcasting would take over operations of This TV on November 1, and that the channel would move to a WGN-TV subchannel following the changes.

On July 1, 2013, Weigel premiered the new subchannel service TouchVision, which provides a rolling news and information service designed for television, mobile and tablet platforms starting on WDJT-DT4, after Milwaukee real estate agency Shorewest Realtors ended their time-lease on the channel space to concentrate on an Internet on-demand channel instead. TouchVision was based out of Weigel's Chicago facilities under the LLC "Think Televisual", and was run by former radio and Tribune executive Lee Abrams and Brandon Davis. TouchVision ceased operations on January 14, 2016.

On September 29, 2014, Weigel launched Heroes & Icons, a new digital subchannel which specializes in reruns of classic television series and films. Heroes & Icons, abbreviated H&I, aims to attract a generally male audience with shows from the genres of action, police, detective, western, science fiction, superhero, and war and military.

On October 21, 2014, Weigel and CBS announced the launch of a new digital subchannel service called Decades, scheduled to launch on all CBS O&O stations in 2015. The channel will be co-owned by Weigel and CBS, with Weigel being responsible for distribution to stations outside CBS Television Stations. It will air programs from the extensive library of CBS Television Distribution, including archival footage from CBS News.

Post-spectrum auction expansion
On July 19, 2017, Weigel agreed to acquire Cedar City, Utah station KCSG for $1.1 million. The sale will convert the station in a H&I owned-and-operated station, though the possibility of Weigel's other networks being contained to it is also possible. It was Weigel's first station purchase outside of a state along Lake Michigan, as all of its properties were in Illinois, Indiana and Wisconsin. This sale closed December 5, 2017.

On September 8, 2017, it was announced that Weigel agreed to purchase Los Angeles, California station KAZA-TV for $9 million. The same day also saw the announcement of the purchase of KNLC in St. Louis, a religious station holding a commercial license, for $3.75 million. Many of its purchases since 2017 have been made through its LLC for WMLW. It sold that station's spectrum in the 2016 FCC auction for $69.7 million, with WMLW itself re-transitioning to the spectrum of WBME-CD. KNLC's former owners continue to maintain a right to the station's second subchannel to carry their schedule as a part of the sale to Weigel.

On October 18, 2017, Weigel agreed to acquire KAXT-CD and KTLN-TV, in San Francisco and KVOS-TV and KFFV in Seattle, from OTA Broadcasting in a $23.2 million deal.  The Seattle deal was completed, while the San Francisco completion took until April 15, 2019, as both KAXT-CD and KTLN-TV are involved in a spectrum transition resulting from the 2016 FCC auction.

On May 30, 2019, Marquee Broadcasting agreed to sell KREG-TV (formerly a satellite of KREX-TV) to Weigel Broadcasting for $2 million. Once the sale closes, the station will become an H&I owned-and-operated station, and likely be positioned as Weigel's station in the Denver market (many stations surrounding Denver have used cable and satellite carriage to take advantage of the larger market reach).

September 1, 2019 saw WCIU-TV taking over the affiliation for The CW in Chicago as "CW 26", replacing Fox-owned WPWR-TV and resulting in the move of some programming and that station's former "The U" branding to WMEU-CD.

In December 2019, Weigel agreed to purchase low-power WHCT-LD in the Hartford, Connecticut market from Venture Technologies Group LLC for $1.5 million.

On September 11, 2020, Weigel announced that it was buying WJFB in Lebanon, Tennessee (serving the Nashville television market), from HC2 Holdings for $5.5 million, pending FCC approval. On October 28, Weigel announced it will acquire KAZD in Dallas, KYAZ in Houston, KMOH-TV in Kingman, Arizona, and its Phoenix translator KEJR-LD from HC2, for $35 million.  The sale of the Arizona and Texas stations, which at the time of acquisition were all affiliated with Azteca América and later converted to MeTV owned-and-operated stations, was completed on December 29. All of the HC2 sales except for WJFB came with the move of the Azteca America affiliations to subchannels under long-term affiliation agreements with Weigel.

On September 1, 2021, Weigel acquired WZME in Bridgeport, Connecticut, moving into the New York/Tri-State market for the first time. On October 11, 2021, Weigel filed to acquire WJLP, licensed to Middletown Township, New Jersey and transmitting from 4 Times Square, from PMCM TV LLC for $62.5 million. In March 2022, Weigel filed to purchase Cleveland, Ohio-based W27EA-D.

On February 14, 2022, Weigel announced that it would launch Story Television, a digital multicast network, on March 28, 2022. The network's focus is on historical and factual programming and utilizes the library of the cable network History, expanding its non-fiction offerings beyond Through the Decades.

On February 13, 2023, Weigel announced that Decades would be re-branded as Catchy Comedy on March 27, 2023. It will focus on classic sitcoms weekdays with comedy marathons on weekends.

Major assets

Television stations
Stations arranged alphabetically by state and by city of license. Most of the stations are categorized into separate limited partnerships for licensing purposes, with many of Weigel's post-2017 deals using the WMLW limited partnership as a direct result of the profits from that station's spectrum sale.

Notes:
 (**) - Indicates stations built and signed on by Weigel.

Television networks
Decades (launched in 2015; will be re-branded as Catchy Comedy on March 27, 2023)
H&I - Heroes & Icons (launched in 2014; on WCIU-TV, WMLW-TV)
MeTV - Memorable Entertainment Television (launched in 2003; as a block on WFBT-CA)
MeTV+ (launched in 2021; extending the MeTV franchise of classic programming.)
Movies! (launched in 2013; joint venture with Fox Television Stations)
Start TV (launched in 2018)
Story Television (launched in 2022)

Radio station
WRME-LD 87.7FM - branded as "MeTV FM" (Chicago, Illinois; local marketing agreement with Venture Technologies Group) (also broadcasts TV signal on digital TV channel 6)

References

External links
 
MeTV website
MeTV FM website 
John Weigel - Man of UHF
WCIU Website

 
Television broadcasting companies of the United States
Companies based in Chicago